John Crawford Buchan (10 October 1892 – 22 March 1918) was a Scottish recipient of the Victoria Cross, the highest and most prestigious award for gallantry in the face of the enemy that can be awarded to British and Commonwealth forces.

Born on 10 October 1892 in Alloa, Clackmannanshire, Scotland, he was the son of the local newspaper editor. He worked as a reporter before enlisting in the Royal Army Medical Corps in the ranks when World War I broke out. He was later commissioned into the Argyll and Sutherland Highlanders.

World War I
Buchan was 25 years old, and a second lieutenant in the 7th Battalion, Argyll and Sutherland Highlanders (Princess Louise's), British Army, attached to 8th Battalion during the First World War, and was awarded the VC for an act he performed on 21 March 1918 east of Marteville, France. He died the following day, 22 March 1918.

Citation

He was buried at Roisel Communal Cemetery Extension, Roisel, Somme, France (Plot: II. L. 6)

Medals
His medals are in the collection of the Argyll & Sutherland Highlanders Museum, Stirling Castle, Scotland.

References

Monuments to Courage (David Harvey, 1999)
The Register of the Victoria Cross (This England, 1997)
Scotland's Forgotten Valour (Graham Ross, 1995)
VCs of the First World War: Spring Offensive 1918 (Gerald Gliddon, 1997)

1892 births
1918 deaths
British Army personnel of World War I
British World War I recipients of the Victoria Cross
British military personnel killed in World War I
Argyll and Sutherland Highlanders officers
Royal Army Medical Corps soldiers
People from Alloa
People educated at Alloa Academy
British Army recipients of the Victoria Cross
Scottish military personnel